Pizzaman or Pizza Man may refer to:

 Pizza delivery person
 Pizza Man (1991 film), an American comedy film by J.F. Lawton
 Pizza Man (2011 film), an American family action film by Joe Eckardt
 Pizza Man (2015 film), an Indonesian film starring Karina Nadila
 Pizzaman (band), a 1990s British electronic music duo featuring Norman Cook  
 The Pizza Man (foaled 2009), an American Thoroughbred racehorse
 Ray Pizzi (1943–2021), nicknamed "Pizza Man", American jazz musician
 "Pizza Man", a song from the 1973 National Lampoon off-Broadway show Lemmings

See also
 Pizzaboy (disambiguation)
 Pizza Guy (disambiguation)
 Mister Pizza, a Brazilian pizza chain
 Mr. Pizza, a South Korean pizza chain